Dust Moth is an American rock band from Seattle, Washington, formed by members of the bands Undertow, These Arms Are Snakes, and Minus the Bear.

History
Dust Moth member Ryan Frederiksen played in the bands These Arms Are Snakes, Narrows, and Undertow, and vocalist Irene Barber (former singer/guitarist for XVIII Eyes and current Erik Blood collaborator); Matt Bayles formerly played keyboards for Minus the Bear. After signing with the label The Mylene Sheath, the group released a split 7-inch vinyl record with the band Aeges in 2013. On April 22, 2014, the group's debut full-length, Dragon Mouth, was issued on the same label.

Members
Irene Barber - vocals
Ryan Frederiksen - guitar
Steve Becker - bass
Jim Acquavella - drums

Former members
Matt Bayles - keyboards, production
Mark Holcomb - rhythm guitar
Jason Craig - Bass
Jacob James - Bass
Andy King - drums

Discography
Split with Aeges (The Mylene Sheath, 2013)
Dragon Mouth (The Mylene Sheath, 2014)
Scale (The Mylene Sheath, 2016)
Rising//Sailing (A Thousand Arms, March 12th, 2021)

References

Musical groups from Seattle
Rock music groups from Washington (state)